Mitchell Allen Johnson (born March 1, 1942) is a former American football offensive tackle in the National Football League for the Dallas Cowboys, Washington Redskins, Los Angeles Rams and Cleveland Browns. He played college football at UCLA.

Early years
Johnson attended Centennial High School, before moving on to Los Angeles State College.

He transferred to UCLA after his sophomore season, becoming a two-year starter at left tackle. In addition to his talents as a blocker, his athletic ability allowed him to score two touchdowns on tackle-eligible plays.

Professional career

Dallas Cowboys
Johnson was selected in the seventeenth round (229th overall) of the 1965 NFL Draft by the Dallas Cowboys and became the first African-American offensive lineman to make the team in franchise history.

On August 30, 1966, he was traded along with Brig Owens and Jake Kupp, to the Washington Redskins in exchange for Jim Steffen and a fifth round draft choice (#119-Willie Parker).

Washington Redskins (first stint)
In 1966, he was named the starter at left tackle. In 1968, he was placed on the injured reserve list with a dislocated hip and was lost for the season. The next year, he was traded to the Los Angeles Rams in exchange for two draft choices.

Los Angeles Rams
Johnson played two seasons as a reserve offensive tackle with the Los Angeles Rams. On August 11, 1971, he was traded along with a fifth round pick (#128-Greg Kucera) to the Cleveland Browns in exchange for Joe Taffoni.

Cleveland Browns
Although Johnson had previously announced his retirement, on July 31, 1972, he was traded to the Washington Redskins along with a 1974 eighth round selection (#196-Darwin Robinson) in exchange for a 1973 third round draft choice (#54-Paul Howard).

Washington Redskins (second stint)
On September 14, 1972, he was moved from the regular roster to the taxi squad.

Florida Blazers (WFL)
On June, 23, 1974, he signed a contract with the Florida Blazers and played one season in the World Football League. He helped Tommy Reamon become one of the league's Tri- MVP's and its leading rusher.

References

1942 births
Living people
Players of American football from Chicago
American football offensive tackles
Florida Blazers players
UCLA Bruins football players
Cal State Los Angeles Diablos football players
Dallas Cowboys players
Washington Redskins players
Los Angeles Rams players
Cleveland Browns players
Los Angeles State College alumni